Harry Weibel (born 20 June 1946) is a German historian. His main topics are neo-Nazism, right-wing extremism and antisemitism in the GDR and racism in Germany from 1945 to the present.

Life 
Born in Lörrach, Waibel comes from a working-class family. He graduated in 1962 with mittlere Reife and then completed an apprenticeship as an industrial clerk. After his discharge from the Bundeswehr he worked in different companies as a commercial clerk.

Waibel wrote for  "Sumpfblüte" and "Links unten".

He continued his studies at the Free University of Berlin and finished them with a diploma in education. In 1993 he was awarded a doctorate by Wolfgang Benz at the Center for Research on Antisemitism of the Technical University Berlin with a study on neo-Nazism, antisemitism and racism in the GDR under the title Rechtsextremisten in der DDR bis 1989. Both courses of study and the doctorate were financially supported by the union's own Hans-Böckler-Stiftung.

Waibel researches in the archives of the Stasi Records Agency and the German Federal Archives (SAPMO) on racism in the GDR.

He lives and works as a freelance journalist and historian in Berlin.

Work and reception 
In his book Rechtsextremisten in der DDR bis 1989, Waibel argues, among other things, that the authoritarian structure of the GDR was particularly effective against young people and was an essential prerequisite for young people to adopt xenophobic and profascist attitudes. Bureaucracy and centralism had been the ideal breeding ground for right-wing extremist attitudes. The GDR leadership had created an authoritarian state that made it easy for right-wing extremists to find social connections.

In 2011 Waibel published the book Diener vieler Herren. Critics note that the early entry of young people into the NSDAP does not allow any conclusions to be drawn about their actual later attitudes.

Publications

Monographs 
 Rechtsextremismus in der DDR bis 1989. (PapyRossa-Hochschulschriften. Vol. 11). , Cologne 1996,  (dissertation, TU Berlin, 1993).
 Diener vieler Herren. Ehemalige NS-Funktionäre in der SBZ/DDR. Peter Lang publishing house, Frankfurt 2011, .
 Rassisten in Deutschland. Peter Lang, Frankfurt 2012, .
 Der gescheiterte Anti-Faschismus der SED. Rassismus in der DDR. Peter Lang, Frankfurt, 29. April 2014, .
 Die braune Saat. Antisemitismus und Neonazismus in der DDR. Schmetterling Verlag, Stuttgart, 1. edition 2017, .
 Die braune Saat. Antisemitismus und Neonazismus in der DDR / 2. part, e-Dokumentation. Schmetterling Verlag, Stuttgart, 2018, .

Articles in anthologies 
 Jugendliche Rechtsextremisten in der DDR und die Reaktionen der FDJ. In Helga Gotschlich (ed.): "Links und links und Schritt gehalten …" Die FDJ: Konzepte, Abläufe, Grenzen. Metropol Verlag, Berlin 1994, .
 Neofaschisten in der DDR. In Manfred Büttner (ed.): Braune Saat in jungen Köpfen. Volume 1 Theorie und Ideologie des Rechtsextremismus und Nationalsozialismus in Geschichte und Gegenwart. , Baltmannsweiler 1999, ; .

Articles in newspapers 
 Neofaschismus in Ostdeutschland. In Ost-West-Gegeninformationen, Vierteljahresschrift. Nr. 4/1996, Dossier.
 Rechtsextremismus in der DDR. In Deutsche Lehrerzeitung (DLZ). 28 March 1996, 13th edition, p. 7.
 Kritik des Antisemitismus in der DDR. In Sozial.Geschichte. Issue 3/2006
 Kritik des Anti-Faschismus in der DDR. In sozial.geschichte.extra. 3 December 2007 (PDF).
 Verleugnende Verdrängung. Rassisten in der DDR und die Folgen bis heute. In . 2013 (PDF).
 Betrachtungen über die Diskussionskultur von Linken in Deutschland. In Zeitschrift antirassistischer Gruppen (ZAG). Number 64/2013, Berlin, .
 Krise des Anti-Faschismus. In Zeitschrift antirassistischer Gruppen (ZAG). Number 66/2014.
 Rassismus in der DDR. Über den gescheiterten Antifaschismus der SED. In Gerbergasse 18. Thüringer Vierteljahresschrift für Zeitgeschichte und Politik. 2/2015 edition. Issue 75, Jena, .
 Der gescheiterte Antifaschismus der SED. In Kritiknetz – Zeitschrift für kritische Theorie der Gesellschaft. 2015 (PDF, 232 kB).
 Rassismus in der DDR. In Zeitschrift des Forschungsverbundes SED-Staat. Edition Nr. 39/2016, .
 Review by Claudia Pawlowitsch: Die braune Saat. Antisemitismus und Neonazismus in der DDR. Neues Archiv für sächsische Geschichte 90 (2019) reviews,

References

External links 
 
 
 

1946 births
Living people
People from Lörrach
20th-century German historians
21st-century German historians